Bostock is a surname which originates from the Cheshire area. Ancient pedigrees claim that a Saxon thane named Osmer is the progenitor, though this is now doubted. Osmer's place of birth is not known but is likely to have been somewhere in Cheshire where he held a number of manors. He is alleged to have had a son named Hugh and a grandson named Richard. The first use of the surname was in the early 13th century with one Gilbert de Bostoc.

The surname originated from the place name in central Cheshire written as Botestoche in the Domesday Book. It is a compound of two Saxon words: Bota, which is likely to be a personal name, and stoc, which indicates a minor settlement or hamlet, perhaps surrounded by a stockade of tree stumps. Therefore, the original place-name means Bota's hamlet.

The surnames Bostick and Bostwick are variations of Bostock.

People
Notable people with the surname include:

 Barbara Bostock (born 1935), American actress
 Billy Bostock (1943–1996), Scottish footballer
 Sir David Bostock (1948–2016), British diplomat
 Euphemia Bostock (aka Phemie Bostock), Aboriginal Australian artist, involved with the National Black Theatre in Sydney in the 1970s
 Gerald Bostock, the plaintiff in the landmark United States Supreme Court case Bostock v. Clayton County, Georgia
 Hewitt Bostock (1864–1930), Canadian publisher, businessman and politician
 John Bostock (physician) (1773–1846), British physician and geologist
 John Bostock (born 1992), English footballer
 Lionel Bostock (1888-1962), British army officer and cricketer
 Lyman Bostock (1950–1978), American baseball player
 Mike Bostock, American programmer and data-visualization specialist.
 Nathan Bostock (born 1960), British banker
 Robert Bostock (1784–1847), British slave trader
 Roy J. Bostock, American businessman
 Thomas Edward Bostock, Australian politician
 William Bostock (1892–1968), Australian military commander and politician

fictional characters
 Gerald Bostock (born circa 1964), the fictional writer of the Jethro Tull album Thick as a Brick

See also
 Bostick
 Bostwick (disambiguation)

References

External links
 Bostock Software Development & Consultancy Ltd.: BOSTOCK.net "The website for the world's Bostocks"

English-language surnames
Lists of people by surname